= Boutsen =

Boutsen is a surname. Notable people with the surname include:

- Gabriël Boutsen (1903–1970), Belgian priest and missionary
- Mathieu Boutsen (born 1946), Belgian politician
- Thierry Boutsen (born 1957), Belgian racing driver
